Georgy Feodosevich Voronoy (28 April 1868 – 20 November 1908) was an Imperial Russian mathematician of Ukrainian descent noted for defining the Voronoi diagram.

Biography
Voronoy was born in the village of Zhuravka, Pyriatyn, in the Poltava Governorate, which was a part of the Russian Empire at that time and is in Varva Raion, Chernihiv Oblast, Ukraine.

Beginning in 1889, Voronoy studied at Saint Petersburg University, where he was a student of Andrey Markov. In 1894 he defended his master's thesis On algebraic integers depending on the roots of an equation of third degree.  In the same year, Voronoy became a professor at the University of Warsaw, where he worked on continued fractions.  In 1897, he defended his doctoral thesis On a generalisation of a continuous fraction. He was an Invited Speaker of the ICM in 1904 at Heidelberg.

When he was only 40 years of age, Voronoy began having stomach problems. He wrote in his diary:I am making great progress with the question under study [indefinite quadratic forms]; however, at the same time my health is becoming worse and worse. Yesterday I had for the first time a clear idea of the algorithm in the theory of forms I am investigating, but also suffered a strong attack of bilious colic which prevented me from working in the evening and from sleeping the whole night. I am so afraid that the results of my enduring efforts, obtained with such difficulty, will perish along with me.Following a severe gall bladder attack, Voronoy died on November 20, 1908.

Works

Voronoy introduced the concept of what we today call Voronoi diagrams or tessellations. They are used in many areas of science, such as the analysis of spatially distributed data, having become an important topic in geophysics, meteorology, condensed matter physics, and Lie groups.

These tessellations are widely used in many areas of computer graphics, from architecture to film making and video games. Blender 3D includes a Voronoi texture generator as one of its main sources of randomly generated images, that can be applied as textures for many different uses.

Legacy

Among his students was Wacław Sierpiński (Ph.D. at Jagiellonian University in 1906). Although he was not formally the doctoral advisor of Boris Delaunay (Ph.D. at Kyiv University), his influence on the latter earns him the right to be considered so.

In 2008, Ukraine released two-hryvnia coins commemorating the centenary of Voronoy's death.

His son  became a prominent transplant surgeon who performed the world's first human-to-human kidney transplant in 1933, volunteered for the army of Central Council of Ukraine, and fought in the Battle of Kruty. His daughter Mariia Vorona-Vasylenko became a teacher of Ukrainian language.

See also

Bowyer–Watson algorithm
Centroidal Voronoi tessellation
Delaunay triangulation
Fortune's algorithm
Laguerre–Voronoi diagram
Voronoi deformation density
Voronoi formula
Voronoi iteration
Voronoi pole
Weighted Voronoi diagram
Wigner–Seitz cell

References

Further reading
.

External links
 
 

1868 births
1908 deaths
People from Chernihiv Oblast
People from Poltava Governorate
People from Warsaw Governorate
19th-century mathematicians from the Russian Empire
20th-century Russian mathematicians
Academic staff of the University of Warsaw
Saint Petersburg State University alumni
Corresponding members of the Saint Petersburg Academy of Sciences